Steve Bailey  is an American bassist. He is the chair of the bass department at Berklee College of Music.

Career
Bailey began playing bass guitar at age 12 and started playing fretless bass after he ran over his fretted Stuart Spector with his car. He started playing double bass after hearing Stanley Clarke playing with Return to Forever. He has been a faculty member at Coastal Carolina University and the University of North Carolina Wilmington. He was also a faculty member at Hollywood's BIT for 10 years. He is a co-founder of Victor Wooten's Bass/Nature Camp, which helps to teach bassists of all ranges. Thebassvault.com is also a joint project with Bailey and Wooten. He is an avid tennis player and surfer. 

Bailey has worked with Ernestine Anderson, Bass Extremes, David Benoit, Tab Benoit, Michel Camilo, Larry Carlton, Paquito D'Rivera, Chris Duarte, Bryan Duncan, Brandon Fields, Dave Liebman, Dizzy Gillespie, Scott Henderson, Carol Kaye, Kitaro, T Lavitz, James Moody, Mark Murphy, Willie Nelson, John Patitucci, Ray Price, Toni Price, Emily Remler, The Rippingtons, Claudio Roditi, Billy Joe Shaver, Billy Sheehan, Lynyrd Skynyrd, Mel Tormé, and Jethro Tull.

His latest Album, CAROLINA, is a collection of 17 duets (one track of bass and another person doing what they do) featuring 17 different guests including Willie Nelson, Ian Anderson, Ron Carter, Victor Wooten, Mike Stern, Becca Stevens, Dennis Chambers and much more.

Bailey has "authored" 3 different signature bass models.

 Aria AVBSB 1992-2002
 Fender SRB Jazz BASS 6 2008-2010
 Warwick Signature Steve Bailey models, 4, 5, &6 string 2010-present

Discography

As leader 
 Dichotomy (Victor, 1991)
 Evolution (Victor, 1993)
 Bass Extremes "Cookbook" with Victor Wooten (Tonecenter, 1995)
 Bass Extremes Vol. 2 with Victor Wooten (Tonecenter, 1998)
 Bass Extremes Just Add Water with Victor Wooten (Tonecenter, 2001)
 So Low...Solo (BATB, 2007)
 Carolina (Treehouse, 2020)

As sideman 

With David Benoit
 Inner Motion (GRP, 1990)
 Letter to Evan (GRP, 1992)
 Shaken Not Stirred (GRP, 1994)

With Tab Benoit
 Nice & Warm (Justice, 1992)
 What I Live For (Justice, 1994)

With Paquito D'Rivera
 Live at the Keystone Korner (Columbia, 1983) – live
 Taste of Paquito (Columbia, 1994) – compilation

With Steve Reid
 Bamboo Forest (Sugo, 1994)
 Water Sign (Telarc, 1996)

With The Rippingtons
 Tourist in Paradise (GRP, 1989)
 Welcome to St. James' Club (GRP, 1990)
 Curves Ahead (GRP, 1991)
 Weekend in Monaco (GRP, 1992)

With Harry Sheppard
 This-a-Way That-a-Way (Justice, 1991)
 Points of View (Justice, 1992)

With Victor Wooten
 Yin-Yang (Compass, 1999)[2CD]
 Soul Circus (Vanguard, 2005)
 Palmystery (Heads Up International, 2008) – recorded in 2004–07
 Words and Tones (Vix, 2012)
 Sward and Stone (Vix, 2012)

With others
 Doug Cameron, Rendezvous (Higher Octave Music, 1996)
 Jesse Dayton, Raisin' Cain (Justice, 1995)
 Bryan Duncan, Strong Medicine (Modern Art, 1989)
 Russ Freeman, Holiday (GRP, 1995)
 Jeff Kashiwa, Remember Catalina (Fahrenheit, 1995)
 Kitaro, Dream (Geffen, 1992)
 Masi, Downtown Dreamers (Metal Blade, 1988)
 Roberto Perera, Erotica (Epic, 1990) – recorded in 1988
 Ray Price, Prisoncer of Love (Justice, 2000)
 Toni Price, Lowdown & Up (Antone's, 1999)
 David Rice, Released (Justice, 1994)
 Shaver, Highway of Life ((Justice, 1996)
 Starfighters, In-Flight Movie (Jive, 1982)
 Jethro Tull, Roots to Branches (EMI, 1995)
 Robin Williamson, The Old Fangled Tone (Pig's Whisker Music, 1999)

Books 
 Advanced Rock Bass (1991)
 Five String Bass (1991)
 Fretless Bass
 Rock Bass (1991)
 Six String Bass (1991)
 Bass Extremes (1993) by Steve Bailey and Victor Wooten

Videos 
 Fretless Bass REH (1992)
 Bass Extremes: Live (1994)
 The Day Bass Players Took Over the World, Victor Wooten, Oteil Burbridge (2006)
 Warwick: Fuss on the Buss 1, featuring Larry Graham, Bootsy, TM Stevens, etc. (2009)  
 Warwick: Fuss on the Buss II, featuring Bootsy, Robert Trujillo, Lee Sklar, Verdine White, etc. (2011)
 Warwick: Fuss on the Buss III, featuring Ralph Armstrong, Larry Graham, Jonas Hellborg, Ryan Martini, TM Stevens, etc. (2012)

References

External links
 Official website

Living people
1960 births
20th-century American bass guitarists
People from Myrtle Beach, South Carolina
The Rippingtons members